Tailwind CSS is an open source CSS framework. The main feature of this library is that, unlike other CSS frameworks like Bootstrap, it does not provide a series of predefined classes for elements such as buttons or tables. Instead, it creates a list of "utility" CSS classes that can be used to style each element by mixing and matching.

For example, in other traditional systems, there would be a class  that would apply a yellow background color and bold text.

As of 23rd January 2023, Tailwind CSS has over 64,400 stars on GitHub.

Features 
Due to the difference in basic concepts in relation to other traditional CSS frameworks such as Bootstrap, it is important to know the philosophy from which Tailwind was created, as well as its basic usage.

Utility Classes 
The utility-first concept refers to the main differentiating feature of Tailwind. Instead of creating classes around components (button, panel, menu, textbox ...), classes are built around a specific style element (yellow color, bold font, very large text, center element...). Each of these classes is called utility classes.

There are many utility classes in TailwindCSS that enable to control a large number of CSS properties like colors, border, display type (display), font size and font, layout, shadow...

Variants 

Tailwind offers the possibility to apply a utility class only in some situations through media queries, which is called a variant. The main use of variants is to design a responsive interface for various screen sizes.

Variants have two parts: the condition to be met and the class that is applied if the condition is met.

Tailwind CSS is developed using JavaScript, runs via Node.js, and installs with environment package managers like npm or yarn.

Settings and Themes 

It is possible to configure the utility classes and variants that Tailwind offers through a configuration file usually named . In the configuration one can set the values of the utility classes, such as the color-palette or the sizes between elements for margins.

Build All and Purge 

The default mode of Tailwind is that the system generates all possible CSS combinations based on the project settings. Then, by means of another utility such as PurgeCSS, all the files are traversed, and the classes that are not being used are removed from the resulting CSS file.

Due to the number of classes that can be generated by the number of variants and their combinations, this method has the drawbacks of long waiting times and large sizes of CSS files before being purged. This mode of operation is no longer available in version 3 of Tailwind CSS.

JIT 

JIT mode (Just-In-Time) is an alternative way to generate the CSS that, instead of generating all possible classes and then removing all those that are not being used, parses the content of HTML files (or configured extensions or locations) and instantly generates only those classes that are needed and used.

Because all possible variables are no longer generated, the waiting time and size of the resulting CSS files is greatly reduced. This technical improvement has made it possible to introduce numerous new variants and utility classes, as well as the ability to create utility classes on the fly with arbitrary values ​​not set in the configuration.

Starting with version 3 of Tailwind CSS, JIT mode has become the default.

Versions 

Tailwind CSS uses semantic versioning to identify its version compatibility.

Prominent uses 

 GitHub
 Firefox
 Netlify
 NBA
 NASA
 Netflix
 The Verge
 NBA

See also 

 Bootstrap (framework)

References

External links 

 Official Tailwind Documentation.
 Tailwind Play, real-time testing environment.

Web frameworks
Cascading Style Sheets